Csaba Gyutai (born 14 October 1966) is a Hungarian politician, who served as Mayor of Zalaegerszeg from October 2010 to October 2014.

He was a member of the National Assembly (MP) from Zala County Regional List between 2010 and 2014. He worked for the Parliamentary Committee on Culture and the Media. For the 2014 municipal elections his party, the Fidesz local branch nominated Zoltán Balaicz as mayoral candidate in Zalaegerszeg instead of Gyutai.

Personal life
He is married and has four children.

References

1966 births
Living people
Fidesz politicians
Members of the National Assembly of Hungary (2010–2014)
Mayors of places in Hungary
People from Zalaegerszeg